The 2023 Nonthaburi Challenger II was a professional tennis tournament played on hard courts. It was the 5th edition of the tournament which was part of the 2023 ATP Challenger Tour. It took place in Nonthaburi, Thailand from 9 to 14 January 2023.

Singles main-draw entrants

Seeds

 1 Rankings are as of 2 January 2023.

Other entrants
The following players received wildcards into the singles main draw:
  Palaphoom Kovapitukted
  Kasidit Samrej
  Wishaya Trongcharoenchaikul

The following players received entry into the singles main draw as alternates:
  Prajnesh Gunneswaran
  Billy Harris

The following players received entry from the qualifying draw:
  Alafia Ayeni
  Arthur Cazaux
  Evgeny Donskoy
  Giovanni Fonio
  Jason Jung
  Henri Squire

Champions

Singles

  Arthur Cazaux def.  Lloyd Harris 7–6(7–5), 6–2.

Doubles

  Yuki Bhambri /  Saketh Myneni def.  Christopher Rungkat /  Akira Santillan 2–6, 7–6(9–7), [14–12].

References

2023 in Thai sport
2023 ATP Challenger Tour
January 2023 sports events in Thailand